Al Davison is an English comic book writer and artist from Newcastle, England. He now resides in Coventry, where he runs The Astral Gypsy, his studio and comic shop in Fargo Village, Far Gosford Street, with his wife Maggie. He is most famous for his autobiographical graphic novel The Spiral Cage (Renegade Press, 1988, longer version Titan Books, 1990, Absolute edition from Active Images, 2003), which describes his lifelong struggle with spina bifida and his rise to successful comic book creator, martial arts instructor, film maker, and performer. The Spiral Cage featured in Tony Isabella's 1000 Comic Books You Must Read.

He is the subject of a documentary, also called The Spiral Cage, directed by Paul W. S. Anderson.

As part of the 10-day Festival800, which took place in Lincoln from 28 August to 6 September 2015, he has been commissioned to create Manga Carta – a 10-page, 30-panel graphic tale of the journey and impact of the 800-year-old Magna Carta. Manga Carta is available for download from the festival website since mid-August 2015.

Bibliography
Crisis, issue 34, 1989
The Spiral Cage original graphic novel, 1990
Minotaur's Tale Dark Horse Books, 1992
Tainted (with Jamie Delano) one-shot, 1995
The Endless Gallery, one-shot, 1995
Teknophage, (with Paul Jenkins) 7–10, 1995
Hellblazer issue 101 (with Paul Jenkins) (mistakenly credited to Sean Phillips), 1996
Vermillion, 1–7, (with Lucius Shepard) 1996-97
The Dreaming, 20–21, 1998
The Dreaming, (with Caitlin R Kiernan) 41, 1999
Spiral Dreams 2000
9/11, anthology, one story, 2002
The Spiral Cage Active Image edition, 2003
Hokusai Demons Astral Gypsy Ltd, 2009
Doctor Who, (with Tony Lee) 1–2, 7-8 2009-10
Doctor Who, 2010
The Unwritten issue 24, 2009
House of Mystery issue 17, 2009
The Alchemist's Easel The Astral Gypsy Ltd 2013
Tommy Taylor & The Ship That Sank Twice Vertigo 2014
The Unwritten Apocalypse #5 & #7 Vertigo 2014
 Manga Carta, 2015

References

20th-century births
Living people
English comics artists
Artists from Newcastle upon Tyne
Writers from Newcastle upon Tyne
People with spina bifida
Year of birth missing (living people)